Senator Tilghman may refer to:

Bill Tilghman (1854–1924), Oklahoma State Senate
Matthew Tilghman (1718–1790), Maryland State Senate
Richard Tilghman (1920–2017), Pennsylvania State Senate

See also
Senator Tillman (disambiguation)